Alick Tipoti (born 1975), whose traditional name is Zugub, is a Torres Strait Islander artist, linguist, and activist of the Kala Lagaw Ya people, from Badu Island, in the Zenadh Kes (Torres Strait). His work includes painting, installations, printmaking, sculpture and mask-making, and is focused on preserving the culture and languages of his people.

Early life and education
Tipoti was born in 1975 on Thursday Island and grew up on Badu Island (aka Mulgrave Island); he also has connections with Mabuiag Island. His father, Leniaso, was an artist and cultural adviser, and Alick developed an interest in art as a child. He was given the traditional name of Zugub in order to link him to the spirits of his ancestors, the Zugubal.

He went to primary school on Badu Island, before moving to Thursday Island, gaining an Advance Diploma in Arts at the TAFE college there in 1992  and later graduated with a Bachelor of Visual Arts (Printmaking) at the Australia National University in Canberra in 1998.

Career
Tipoti's artistic practice was initially focused on printmaking, using linocuts. He began exhibiting in small galleries in North Queensland in the early 1990s.

In 2007 he started to make artistic versions of ceremonial masks out of fibreglass, inspired by the traditional turtleshell masks.

He  was commissioned to design an artwork for the floor of the Cairns Airport domestic arrivals hall as well as other buildings, and nine railway carriages of the Tilt Train from Brisbane to Cairns in 2010.

In 2015 he performed the Marimawa (spiritual mask dance) at the British Museum in London.

He has been a longtime friend of artist Dennis Nona (born 1973), who shares similar goals and influences. The work of both artists have been hugely influential in developing a "school of contemporary Torres Strait Islander art". Tipoti has also been a mentor and leader to younger artists in the Torres Strait Islands, who have been influenced by both artists' success.

Current practice
Tipoti's work includes printmaking, sculpture, painting, dance and performance art. His subjects include legendary heroes and his creations include weapons, dhari (the Torres Strait Islander traditional headdress, as featured on the flag), masks, and drums.

His work reflects the culture of his people, the Maluyligal (Maluilgal) of the Torres Strait, with a strong focus on representing his language. His works sometimes have a strong narrative element, sometimes comprising more than one image, and he pays attention to minute details. He aims to document aspects of his culture, including stories, genealogies, and songs, so that future generations can learn from his work, and, as one of the last generations to speak Kala Lagaw Ya (of the Maluilgal nation) fluently, he is involved in programs that help to preserve the language. He also speaks Kala Kawa Ya (of the Guda Maluyligal nation).

He teaches language, culture and history at Tagai State College and Thursday Island TAFE.
 
He lives and works mostly in Cairns.

Activism
Tipoti has been active in informing the public about the dangers of the climate change crisis in the Torres Strait, as well as plastic pollution in the ocean. His exhibit for the Taba Naba - Australia, Oceania, Arts of the Sea People which began at the Oceanographic Museum of Monaco in 2016 brought him into contact with Prince Albert II of Monaco, a keen environmentalist. The prince subsequently visited the Torres Strait and stayed with Tipoti and his family.

In 2021, the full-length documentary film Alick and Albert, by Brisbane film producer Trish Lake and co-written by Tipoti, was released. It includes stories of the Badulgal people of Badu  Island as well as the Monégasque people of Monaco, who are concerned about climate change and the future of the oceans. Most of the filming was able to be done before the COVID-19 pandemic of 2020–21 restricted people's movements. The film had its world premiere at the Brisbane International Film Festival in October 2021.

Recognition and awards
Tipoti has been honoured with a number of awards, starting when he was a student and in his early career. He was named as Townsville Pimlico TAFE College's Art Student of the Year in 1993, and Australian Capital Territory Scholar of the Year after his studies at ANU in 1997. In 1998 he won the Lin Onus Youth Prize in the 4th edition of the National Indigenous Heritage Art Award.

Other awards include:
NAIDOC Awards:
1999: Torres Strait Senior Cultural Award
2009: Torres Strait Senior Cultural Award
2012: Torres Strait Artist of the Year
National Aboriginal & Torres Strait Islander Art Award (NATSIAA)
2003: 20th edition, Works on Paper
2007: 24th edition, Works on Paper
2008: 25th edition, People's Choice Award
2014: 31st edition, 3D Category, Museum and Art Gallery of the Northern Territory, Darwin
2001: Fremantle Print Award, Non-Acquisitive Prize
2008: Fremantle Print Award,  Non-Acquisitive Prize 
2011: ACCELERATE Indigenous Leadership Award, awarded by the British Council and Australia Council
2012: Deadly Awards, Visual Artist of the Year Finalist

Exhibitions
His work has been included in many group exhibitions, including:
2012: UnDisclosed: 2nd National Indigenous Art Triennial at the National Gallery of Australia
2012: 18th Biennale of Sydney
2016–2017: Taba Naba - Australia, Oceania, Arts of the Sea People, exhibiting the largest artwork ever made by a Torres Strait Islander on the roof of the Oceanographic Museum of Monaco, in 2017 travelling to Switzerland, and on to  the Ocean Conference at the United Nations in New York City
2021: The National

His solo exhibitions include:
 2007–2009: Malangu – From the Sea: several galleries around the country, and at Arts d’Australie in Paris, France
 2011: Mawa Adhaz Pa’ar – Sorcerer Masks, Australian Art Network Galleries at Canopy Artspace, Cairns
 2012: Badhulayg – Person of Badu, Gallery Gabrielle Pizzi, Melbourne
 2015: Alick Tipoti Zugubal: Ancestral Spirits, Cairns Regional Gallery, Cairns
 2016: Lagangu, Linden New Art, Melbourne VIC
 2020–2022: Mariw Minaral (Spititual Patterns), Australian National Maritime Museum, Sydney

Collections
His work is held in many collections in Australia and in other countries, including:

 Art Gallery of Western Australia, Perth
 Arts Centre Melbourne
 Australian Museum, Sydney
 British Museum, London
 Cairns Regional Gallery, Cairns 
 Cambridge University Museum, UK
 Canberra School of Arts, Australian National University
 Gold Coast City Art Gallery, Surfers Paradise
 Griffith University, Brisbane
 University of Melbourne, Melbourne 
 Tjibaou Cultural Centre, Noumea, New Caledonia
 Kluge-Ruhe Aboriginal Art Collection, University of Virginia, US
 Musée des Confluences, Lyon, France
 Museum and Art Gallery of the Northern Territory, Darwin
 Museum of Contemporary Art Australia, Sydney
 National Gallery of Australia, Canberra
 National Gallery of Victoria, Melbourne
 National Museum of Australia, Canberra
 Queensland Art Gallery, Brisbane
 Queensland University of Technology, Brisbane
 Torres Strait Regional Authority, Thursday Island
 Parliament House, Canberra
 Parliament House, Wellington, New Zealand

Films
Zugub, the mask, the spirits and the stars (2012)
Alick and Albert (2021)

Footnotes

References

External links

1975 births
Living people
21st-century Australian artists
Torres Strait Islanders
Indigenous Australian artists